Ray Pearse (born 25 July 1984) is an international Australian lawn bowler.

Bowls career

Asia Pacific
Pearse has won four medals at the Asia Pacific Bowls Championships, a silver medal and bronze medal in 2015 and a bronze in the singles and a silver in the pairs with Nathan Rice at the 2019 Asia Pacific Bowls Championships in the Gold Coast, Queensland.

National
Pearse won the 2018 Australian National Bowls Championships and also won the NSW Champion of Club Champions Singles and NSW State Singles titles in 2018. In 2021, he won his second Australian Open crown, this time in the pairs.

References

Australian male bowls players
1984 births
Living people